John B. and Elizabeth Ruthven House, also known as the Wehmeyer House and Ruthven-Wehmeyer House, is a historic home located at Jefferson City, Cole County, Missouri. It was built about 1879, and is a one-story, five bay, Missouri-German Vernacular brick dwelling.  It has a hipped roof, arched brick lintels, and an original rear ell.

It was listed on the National Register of Historic Places in 2000.

References

Houses on the National Register of Historic Places in Missouri
Houses completed in 1879
Buildings and structures in Jefferson City, Missouri
National Register of Historic Places in Cole County, Missouri